Suwasra railway station is a railway station in Mandsaur district of Madhya Pradesh. Its code is SVA. It has two platforms. Passenger, Express and Superfast trains halt here.

References

Railway stations in Mandsaur district
Kota railway division